The Australian National Road Cycling Championships are held annually and are composed of competitions of various road cycling disciplines across various age, gender, and disability categories.

Road race

2023 Results

Individual time trial

2023 Results

Criterium

2023 Results

References

Cycle racing in Australia
National road cycling championships
Cycling